The 1995 World Wushu Championships was the 3rd edition of the World Wushu Championships, and was held in Baltimore, United States of America from August 19 to August 22, 1995. This marked the first time a major international Wushu competition was held outside of Asia, and to-date is the biggest Wushu event held in the United States.

Medal summary

Medal table

Men's talou

Men's sanda

Women's talou

References 


World Wushu Championships
Wushu in the United States
International sports competitions hosted by the United States
August 1995 sports events in the United States
1995 in wushu (sport)
Wushu competitions in the United States
1995 in sports in Maryland